Pierre-Paul Savoie (14 January 1955 – 31 January 2021) was a Canadian dancer and choreographer. He founded the company  in Montreal.

Biography
Savoie studied modern dance at Concordia University and the National Theatre School of Canada. He founded PPS Danse in 1989.

He also choreographed performances at the Montreal International Jazz Festival in 1995 in the Cirque du Soleil. On 21 February 2008, he was awarded the Prix Hommage-Rideau for his contributions to dance in Quebec.

Pierre-Paul Savoie died of cancer on 31 January 2021 at the age of 66.

References

External links
 
 
 Entry for PPS Danse at thecanadianencyclopedia.ca

1955 births
2021 deaths
Canadian male dancers
Canadian choreographers
Concordia University alumni
National Theatre School of Canada alumni
French Quebecers
Deaths from cancer in Quebec